Pleurotomella is a genus of sea snails, marine gastropod mollusks in the family Raphitomidae.

Description
(Original description by Verrill)  As at present understood, this genus is intended to include those species which have a rather broad and very distinct subsutural band, crossed by excurved lines of growth corresponding to the form of the posterior sinus of the lip, which is situated a little below the suture and is always pretty well-developed, but is sometimes broad and shallow, and at other times narrower and very deep. The outer lip is always thin and sharp, without any appearance of a varix, nor is there any deposit of callus on the body whorl, in front of the aperture. The siphonal canal is well developed, generally constricted at the base and somewhat elongated, and usually but slightly curved. In a few of the species, doubtfully referred to hie genus, it is short and wide. The columella-margin is more or less sinuous. The protoconch differs in sculpture, and usually in color, from the rest of the whorls, and is generally minutely cancellated by fine raised lines running obliquely in opposite directions. The remaining whorls are elegantly sculptured by longitudinal ribs and revolving cinguli, and usually have a distinct shoulder or carina, which is frequently nodulous, below the subsutural band. The animal is destitute of an operculum, and, in all the species hitherto examined, is without eyes. The dentition consists of rather strong uncini, usually with a barbed tip and broad base.

(Description by Dall) The larval shell is multispiral. The adult shell shows a small blunt protoconch of several (usually) swollen whorls, closely arcuately axially ribbed. This protoconch is dark and sculptured with criss-cross lines, strongly contrasting with the rest of the shell. The succeeding short-fusiform whorls have an axial and (fainter) spiral sculpture. The anal sulcus is close to the suture, deep and wide, with a distinct fasciole. The siphonal canal is very short, narrow, recurved. The outer lip is thin, simple and sharp. The columella is thin, gyrate, anteriorly obliquely truncate, almost pervious. The animal is blind and lacks an operculum

Species
Species within the genus Pleurotomella include:

 Pleurotomella aculeata (Webster, 1906)
 Pleurotomella aculeola (Hedley, 1915)
 Pleurotomella allisoni Rehder & Ladd, 1973
 Pleurotomella amphiblestrum (Melvill, 1904)
 Pleurotomella amplecta (Hedley, 1922)
 Pleurotomella anceyi (Dautzenberg & Fischer, 1897)
 Pleurotomella annulata Thiele, 1912
 Pleurotomella anomalapex Powell, 1951
 † Pleurotomella balcombensis (Powell, 1944) 
 † Pleurotomella bateroensis Lozouet, 1999 
 Pleurotomella bathybia Strebel, 1908
 † Pleurotomella bellistriata Clark, 1895  
 Pleurotomella benedicti Verrill, 1884
 † Pleurotomella bezanconi Cossmann, 1902
 † Pleurotomella bezoyensis Lozouet, 2017 
 Pleurotomella borbonica J.C. Melvill, 1923
 Pleurotomella brenchleyi (Angas, 1877)
 Pleurotomella buccinoides (Shuto, 1983)
 Pleurotomella bullata (Laseron, 1954)
 Pleurotomella bureaui (Dautzenberg & Fischer, 1897)
 Pleurotomella cala (R. B. Watson, 1886)
 Pleurotomella cancellata Sysoev, 1988
 Pleurotomella capricornea (Hedley, 1922)
 † Pleurotomella chapplei (Powell, 1944) 
 Pleurotomella circumvoluta (Watson, 1881)
 Pleurotomella clathurellaeformis Schepman, 1913
 Pleurotomella coelorhaphe (Dautzenberg & Fischer H., 1896)
 Pleurotomella compacta (Hedley, 1922)
 † Pleurotomella contigua (Powell, 1944) 
 Pleurotomella corrida Dall, 1927
 † Pleurotomella cuspidata (Chapple, 1934) 
 Pleurotomella deliciosa Thiele, 1912
 Pleurotomella demosia (Dautzenberg & Fischer, 1896)
 † Pleurotomella dimeres (Cossmann, 1889)
 Pleurotomella dinora Dall, 1908
 Pleurotomella ecphora (Melvill, 1904)
 Pleurotomella elisa Thiele, 1925
 Pleurotomella elusiva (Dall, 1881)
 Pleurotomella endeavourensis Dell, 1990
 Pleurotomella enderbyensis Powell, 1958
 Pleurotomella enora (Dall, 1908)
 †Pleurotomella eomargaritata Lozouet, 2015 
 † Pleurotomella esmeralda Olsson, 1964 
 † Pleurotomella espisbosensis Lozouet, 2015 
 Pleurotomella eulimenes (Melvill, 1904)
 Pleurotomella eurybrocha (Dautzenberg & Fischer, 1896)
 Pleurotomella evadne Melvill, 1912
 Pleurotomella expeditionis (Dell, 1956) 
 Pleurotomella formosa (Jeffreys, 1867)
 † Pleurotomella fragilis (Deshayes, 1834)
 Pleurotomella frigida Thiele, 1912
 Pleurotomella gibbera Bouchet & Warén, 1980
 † Pleurotomella goniocolpa (Cossmann, 1889)
 † Pleurotomella granulatorappardi Janssen, 1979
 Pleurotomella granuliapicata Okutani, 1964
 † Pleurotomella grimmertingenensis Marquet, Lenaerts & Laporte, 2016 
 † Pleurotomella guespellensis (Cossmann, 1889)
 Pleurotomella hadria (Dall, 1889)
 Pleurotomella hayesiana (Angas, 1871)
 Pleurotomella helena Thiele, 1925
 Pleurotomella herminea Dall, 1919
 Pleurotomella hermione (Dall, 1919)
 Pleurotomella hypermnestra Melvill, 1912
 Pleurotomella imitator (Dall, 1927)
 Pleurotomella innocentia (Dell, 1990)
 † Pleurotomella insignifica (Heilprin, 1879)
 † Pleurotomella intermedia Gougerot & Le Renard, 1982
 Pleurotomella ipara (Dall, 1881)
 † Pleurotomella irminonvilla Pacaud, 2021 
 Pleurotomella itama (Melvill, 1906)
 Pleurotomella lucasii (Melvill, J.C., 1904)
 Pleurotomella maitasi Engl, 2008
 Pleurotomella marshalli (Sykes, 1906)
 † Pleurotomella megapex Lozouet, 1999 
 Pleurotomella minuta Sysoev & Ivanov, 1985
 † Pleurotomella neerrepenensis Marquet, Lenaerts & Laporte, 2016 
 Pleurotomella nipri (Numanami, 1996)
 Pleurotomella normalis (Dall, 1881)
 Pleurotomella obesa Bouchet & Warén, 1980
 Pleurotomella ohlini (Strebel, 1905)
 Pleurotomella orariana (Dall, 1908)
 † Pleurotomella orthocolpa Cossmann, 1902
 Pleurotomella packardii Verrill, 1872
 Pleurotomella pandionis (A. E. Verrill, 1880)
 Pleurotomella papyracea (Watson, 1881)
 Pleurotomella parella Dall, 1908
 Pleurotomella perpauxilla (Watson, 1881)
 Pleurotomella petiti Kantor, Harasewych & Puillandre, 2016
 † Pleurotomella polycolpa (Cossmann, 1889)
 Pleurotomella porcellana (Watson, 1886)
 † Pleurotomella protocarinata Lozouet, 2017 
 † Pleurotomella protocostulata Lozouet, 2017
 Pleurotomella pudens (Watson, 1881)
 Pleurotomella puella Thiele, 1925
 † Pleurotomella quoniamensis (Boussac in Périer, 1941)
 † Pleurotomella rappardi (von Koenen, 1867)
 † Pleurotomella rappardiformis Lozouet, 2017 
 Pleurotomella rossi Dell, 1990
 † Pleurotomella rothauseni (Gürs, 1998) 
 Pleurotomella rugosa (Laseron, 1954)
 Pleurotomella sandersoni Verrill, 1884
 Pleurotomella sansibarica Thiele, 1925
 Pleurotomella sepulta (Laseron, 1954)
 Pleurotomella siberutensis (Thiele, 1925)
 Pleurotomella simillima Thiele, 1912
 Pleurotomella spicula (Laseron, 1954)
 † Pleurotomella spinosa Lozouet, 2015 
 † Pleurotomella striarella (Lamarck, 1804)
 † Pleurotomella striatulata Lamarck, 1822
 Pleurotomella thalassica Dall, 1919
 Pleurotomella tippetti Kantor, Harasewych & Puillandre, 2016
 Pleurotomella ursula Thiele, 1925
 † Pleurotomella vagans (Koch & Wiechmann, 1872)
 Pleurotomella vaginata Dall, 1927
 Pleurotomella vera Thiele, 1925
 Pleurotomella vercoi (G.B. Sowerby III, 1896)
 † Pleurotomella verticicostata Brébion, 1992
 Pleurotomella virginalis Thiele, 1925
 Pleurotomella ybessa Figueira & Absalão, 2012

Synonyms
 
 Pleurotomella abbreviata Schepman, 1913: synonym of Buccinaria abbreviata (Schepman, 1913) (original combination)
 Pleurotomella abyssorum (Locard, 1897): synonym of Gymnobela abyssorum (Locard, 1897)
 Pleurotomella adelpha Dautzenberg & Fischer, 1896: synonym of Phymorhynchus sulciferus (Bush, 1893)
 Pleurotomella affinis Schepman, 1913: synonym of Cryptodaphne affinis (Schepman, 1913) (original combination)
 Pleurotomella agassizi (Verrill & S. Smith, 1880): synonym of Gymnobela agassizii (Verrill & S. Smith [in Verrill], 1880)
 Pleurotomella aguayoi (Carcelles, 1953): synonym of Austrotoma aguayoi (Carcelles, 1953)
 Pleurotomella aperta Dall, 1927: synonym of Teretiopsis thaumastopsis (Dautzenberg & H. Fischer, 1896) 
 Pleurotomella aquilarum engonia Verrill, 1884: synonym of Gymnobela engonia Verrill, 1884
 Pleurotomella araneosa (Watson, 1881): synonym of Xanthodaphne araneosa (R. B. Watson, 1881)
 Pleurotomella argeta Dall, 1890: synonym of Xanthodaphne argeta (Dall, 1890)
 Pleurotomella atlantica Locard, 1897: synonym of Kryptos koehleri (Locard, 1896)
 Pleurotomella atypha Bush, 1893: synonym of Gymnobela atypha (Bush, 1893) (original combination)
 Pleurotomella bairdi [sic]: synonym of Gymnobela bairdii (Verrill & S. Smith [in Verrill], 1884) (misspelling)
 Pleurotomella bairdi Verrill & Smith, 1884: synonym of Gymnobela bairdii (Verrill & S. Smith [in Verrill], 1884)
 Pleurotomella bandella (Dall, 1881): synonym of Benthomangelia bandella (Dall, 1881)
 Pleurotomella bathyiberica Fechter, 1976: synonym of Theta vayssierei (Dautzenberg, 1925) 
 Pleurotomella biconica Schepman, 1913: synonym of Acamptodaphne biconica (Schepman, 1913) (original combination)
 Pleurotomella bruneri Verrill & S. Smith [in Verrill], 1884: synonym of Xanthodaphne bruneri (Verrill & S. Smith [in Verrill], 1884) (original combination)
 Pleurotomella bullioides Sykes, 1906: synonym of Lusitanops bullioides (Sykes, 1906) (original combination)
 Pleurotomella castanea Dall, 1896: synonym of Phymorhynchus castaneus (Dall, 1896) (original combination)
 Pleurotomella catasarca Dall, 1889: synonym of Theta chariessa (R. B. Watson, 1881) 
 Pleurotomella catharinae Verrill & S. Smith, 1884: synonym of Famelica catharinae (Verrill & S. Smith [in Verrill], 1884)
 Pleurotomella ceramensis Schepman, 1913: synonym of Gymnobela ceramensis (Schepman, 1913) (original combination)
 Pleurotomella chariessa (Watson, 1881): synonym of Theta chariessa (R. B. Watson, 1881)
 Pleurotomella clarinda Dall, 1908: synonym of Phymorhynchus clarinda (Dall, 1908) (original combination)
 Pleurotomella climacella Dall, 1895: synonym of Belomitra climacella (Dall, 1895) (original combination)
 † Pleurotomella cossmanni L. Morellet & J. Morellet, 1946: synonym of  † Pleurotomella irminonvilla Pacaud, 2021 (invalid: junior homonym of Pleurotomella cossmanni Koperberg, 1931; P. irminonvilla is a replacement name)
 Pleurotomella costlowi Petuch, 1974: synonym of Bathybela tenelluna (Locard, 1897) 
 Pleurotomella curta (A. E. Verrill, 1884): synonym of Gymnobela aquilarum (R. B. Watson, 1882)
 Pleurotomella dalli Bush, 1893: synonym of Corinnaeturris leucomata (Dall, 1881)
 Pleurotomella demulcata Locard, 1897: synonym of Kryptos koehleri (Locard, 1896)
 Pleurotomella diastropha Dautzenberg & Fischer, 1896: synonym of Pleurotomella packardii packardii Verrill, A.E., 1872
 Pleurotomella diomedae Verrill, 1884: synonym of Benthomangelia antonia (Dall, 1881) 
 Pleurotomella diomedeae Verrill & S. Smith [in Verrill], 1884: synonym of Benthomangelia antonia (Dall, 1881)
 Pleurotomella dubia Schepman, 1913: synonym of Gymnobela dubia (Schepman, 1913) (original combination)
 Pleurotomella ebor Okutani, 1968: synonym of Cryptomella ebor (Okutani, 1968) (original combination)
 Pleurotomella edgariana (Dall, 1889): synonym of Gymnobela edgariana (Dall, 1889)
 Pleurotomella emertoni Verrill & S. Smith [in Verrill], 1884: synonym of Gymnobela emertoni (Verrill & S. Smith [in Verrill], 1884) (original combination)
 Pleurotomella engonia (A. E. Verrill, 1884): synonym of Gymnobela engonia Verrill, 1884
 Pleurotomella esilda Dall, 1908: synonym of Leucosyrinx esilda (Dall, 1908) (original combination)
 Pleurotomella extensaeformis Schepman, 1913: synonym of Mioawateria extensaeformis (Schepman, 1913) (original combination)
 Pleurotomella fastosa Hedley, 1907: synonym of Microdrillia fastosa (Hedley, 1907) (original combination)
 Pleurotomella frielei Verrill, 1885: synonym of Gymnobela frielei (Verrill, 1885) (original combination)
 Pleurotomella fulvotincta (Dautzenberg & Fischer, 1896): synonym of Gymnobela fulvotincta (Dautzenberg & Fischer, 1896)
 Pleurotomella gradata Schepman, 1913: synonym of Cryptodaphne gradata (Schepman, 1913) (original combination)
 Pleurotomella gregaria Sykes, 1906: synonym of Gymnobela leptoglypta (Dautzenberg & Fischer, 1896)
 Pleurotomella gypsina Dall, 1895: synonym of Pleurotomoides gypsina (Dall, 1895)
 Pleurotomella heterogramma Odhner, 1960: synonym of Xanthodaphne heterogramma (Odhner, 1960) (original combination)
 Pleurotomella ida Thiele, 1925: synonym of Philbertia capensis (E. A. Smith, 1882): synonym of Tritonoturris capensis (E. A. Smith, 1882) (junior synonym)
 Pleurotomella illicita (Dall, 1927): synonym of Gymnobela illicita Dall, 1927
 Pleurotomella isogonia Dall, 1908: synonym of Gymnobela isogonia (Dall, 1908) (original combination)
 Pleurotomella jeffreysi Verrill, 1885: synonym of Theta chariessa (R. B. Watson, 1881) 
 Pleurotomella koehleri Locard, 1896: synonym of Kryptos koehleri (Locard, 1896)
 Pleurotomella leptalea Bush, 1893: synonym of Xanthodaphne leptalea (Bush, 1893) (original combination)
 Pleurotomella lineola Dall, 1927: synonym of Gymnobela lineola (Dall, 1927) (dubious synonym)
 Pleurotomella lottae Verrill, 1885: synonym of Azorilla lottae (Verrill, 1885) 
 Pleurotomella lusitanica Sykes, 1906: synonym of Lusitanops lusitanica [sic]: synonym of Lusitanops lusitanicus (Sykes, 1906) (original combination)
 Pleurotomella lyronuclea A. H. Clarke, 1959: synonym of Theta lyronuclea (A. H. Clarke, 1959) (original combination)
 Pleurotomella megalembryon (Dautzenberg & H. Fischer, 1896): synonym of Azorilla megalembryon (Dautzenberg & H. Fischer, 1896)
 Pleurotomella oceanica Dall, 1908: synonym of Cryptomella oceanica (Dall, 1908) (original combination)
 Pleurotomella oceanida Dall, 1919: synonym of Pleurotomella orariana (Dall, 1908)
 Pleurotomella pachia (Watson, 1881): synonym of Xanthodaphne pachia (R. B. Watson, 1881)
 Pleurotomella polystephanus Dall, 1908: synonym of Cryptogemma polystephanus (Dall, 1908) (original combination)
 Pleurotomella pyriformis Schepman, 1913: synonym of Xanthodaphne pyriformis (Schepman, 1913) (original combination)
 Pleurotomella raineri Engl, 2008: synonym of Xanthodaphne raineri (Engl, 2008) (original combination)
 Pleurotomella reconditum (Locard, 1891): synonym of Bela nuperrima (Tiberi, 1855)
 Pleurotomella rhytismeis Melvill, 1910: synonym of Taranis rhytismeis (Melvill, 1910) (original combination)
 Pleurotomella saffordi Verrill & S. Smith [in Verrill], 1884: synonym of Pleurotomella packardii Verrill, 1872
 Pleurotomella simplicissima Dall, 1907: synonym of Paraspirotropis simplicissima (Dall, 1907) (original combination)
 Pleurotomella stearina Dall, 1889: synonym of Theta chariessa (R. B. Watson, 1881)
 Pleurotomella suffusa (Dall, 1890): synonym of Xanthodaphne suffusa (Dall, 1890)
 Pleurotomella sulcifera Bush, 1893: synonym of Phymorhynchus sulciferus (Bush, 1893) (original combination)
 Pleurotomella tcherniai (Gaillard, 1955): synonym of Xymenopsis tcherniai (Gaillard, 1954)
 Pleurotomella tincta Verrill, 1885: synonym of Gymnobela emertoni (Verrill & S. Smith [in Verrill], 1884) 
 Pleurotomella virgo Okutani, 1966: synonym of Bathytoma virgo (Okutani, 1966) (original combination)
 Pleurotomella vitrea Verrill, 1885: synonym of Gymnobela agassizii (Verrill & S. Smith [in Verrill], 1880)
 Pleurotomella xylona Dall, 1908: synonym of Gymnobela xylona (Dall, 1908) (original combination)

References

 Laseron, C. 1954. Revision of the New South Wales Turridae (Mollusca). Australian Zoological Handbook. Sydney : Royal Zoological Society of New South Wales pp. 56, pls 1–12. 
 Powell, A.W.B. 1966. The molluscan families Speightiidae and Turridae, an evaluation of the valid taxa, both Recent and fossil, with list of characteristic species. Bulletin of the Auckland Institute and Museum. Auckland, New Zealand 5: 1–184, pls 1–23

External links
 Verrill, A. E. (1872-1874). Results of recent dredging expeditions on the coast of New England. American Journal of Science and Arts. ser. 3, 5: 1-16 [issue for January 1873; separate copies distributed 13 Dec. 1872]; 5: 98-106 [Feb. 1873]; 6: 435-441 [Dec. 1873]; 7: 38-46 [Jan. 1874]; 7: 131-138 [Feb. 1874]; 7: 405-414, pls 4-5 [April 1874]; 7: 498-505, pls 6-8 [May 1874&#93
 Kantor Y.I., Harasewych M.G. & Puillandre N. (2016). A critical review of Antarctic Conoidea (Neogastropoda). Molluscan Research. 36(3): 153-206
 
 Worldwide Mollusc Species Data Base: Raphitomidae
 Pacaud J.M. & Le Renard J. (1995). Révision des Mollusques paléogènes du Bassin de Paris. IV- Liste systématique actualisée. Cossmanniana. 3(4): 151-187
 Bouchet, P.; Warén, A. (1980). "Revision of the North-East Atlantic bathyal and abyssal Turridae (Mollusca: Gastropoda)". Journal of Molluscan Studies 46(Suppl. 8): 1-119